James Quinn Decker (October 29, 1907 – December 20, 1987) was an American football player and coach. He served as the head football coach Centre College from 1938 to 1941 and The Citadel from 1946 to 1952, compiling a career college football coaching record of 37–56–3.

Playing career
Decker played fullback at the University of Tennessee. He later became an assistant coach at the school.

Coaching career

High school coaching
Before coaching in college, Decker coached football at the high school level at Central High School in Knoxville, Tennessee.

Centre College
Decker was the head football coach at Centre College in Danville, Kentucky from 1938 until completion of the 1941 season.

The Citadel
Quinn was the 11th head football coach at The Citadel, The Military College of South Carolina, serving for seven seasons, from 1946 until 1952, and compiling a record of 23–39–1.  He led the program in its re-establishment after World War II.

Head coaching record

College football

References

External links
 

1907 births
1987 deaths
American football fullbacks
Centre Colonels athletic directors
Centre Colonels football coaches
Centre Colonels men's basketball coaches
Tennessee Volunteers football coaches
Tennessee Volunteers football players
The Citadel Bulldogs athletic directors
The Citadel Bulldogs football coaches
Third Air Force Gremlins football coaches
High school football coaches in Tennessee